Aubrey James Martyn (4 January 1907 – 13 February 1989) was an Australian rules footballer who played for the Carlton Football Club in the Victorian Football League (VFL). His brother, Colin Martyn, also played in the VFL.

Notes

External links 

Aubrey Martyn's profile at Blueseum
Aubrey Martyn's profile at The VFA Project

1907 births
1989 deaths
Carlton Football Club players
Coburg Football Club players
Australian rules footballers from Melbourne
People from Brunswick, Victoria